Key or The Key may refer to:

Common meanings
 Key (cryptography), a piece of information needed to encode or decode a message
 Key (lock), an object needed to open a mechanical lock
 Key (map), a guide to a map's symbology
 A typewriter or computer keyboard key
 Answer key, a list of answers to a test

In music
 Key (music), the scale of a piece of music
 Key (instrument), finger-operated mechanism in musical instruments
 Keys, colloquial term for keyboard instruments

Geography
 Cay, also spelled key, a small, low-elevation, sandy island formed on the surface of a coral reef

United States 
 Key, Alabama
 Key, Ohio
 Key, West Virginia
 Keys, Oklahoma
 Florida Keys, an archipelago of about 1,700 islands in the southeast United States

Elsewhere
 Rural Municipality of Keys No. 303, Saskatchewan, Canada
 Key, Iran, a village in Isfahan Province, Iran
 Key Island, Tasmania, Australia
 The Key, New Zealand, a locality in Southland, New Zealand

Arts and media

Films
 The Key (1934 film), a 1934 film directed by Michael Curtiz
 The Key (1958 film), a war film directed by Carol Reed, starring William Holden and Sophia Loren
 The Key, also known as Odd Obsession, a 1959 Japanese film directed by Kon Ichikawa
 The Key (1961 film), a Soviet animated feature
 The Key (1965 film), a Yugoslav omnibus film
 The Key (1971 film), a Czechoslovakian drama
 The Key (1983 film), an Italian erotic film directed by Tinto Brass, starring Stefania Sandrelli
 Kelid (The Key), a 1987 Iranian film written by Abbas Kiarostami
 The Key (2007 film), a French thriller film directed by Guillaume Nicloux
 Key (film), a 2011 film
 The Key (2014 film), an American film directed by Jefery Levy

Literature
 The Key (Curley novel), a 2005 novel by Marianne Curley
 The Key (Elfgren and Strandberg novel), a 2013 novel by Mats Strandberg and Sara Bergmark Elfgren
 The Key (Tanizaki novel), a 1956 novel by Jun'ichirō Tanizaki
 "The Key" (short story), a 1966 short story by Isaac Asimov
 The Key, a 1969 book of etymology by John Philip Cohane
 The Key, a magazine published by Kappa Kappa Gamma
The Key, a music publication of WXPN in Philadelphia

Music

Albums
 Key (Meredith Monk album), 1971
 Key (Son, Ambulance album), 2004
 The Key (Joan Armatrading album), 1983
 The Key (Vince Gill album), 1998
 The Key (Nocturnus album), 1990
 The Key (Operation: Mindcrime album), 2015
 Keys (album), a 2021 album by Alicia Keys

Songs
 "The Key" (Speech Debelle song), 2009
 "The Key" (Matt Goss song), 1995
 "The Key" (Ou Est Le Swimming Pool song), 2010
 "Key", a song from the album Maid in Japan by Band-Maid
 "The Key", a song by Edita Abdieski
 "Key", a song from the album Minecraft – Volume Alpha by C418

Television
 "The Key" (Code Lyoko episode), 2005
 "The Key" (Prison Break episode), 2006
 "The Key" (The Walking Dead), 2018
 "The Key" (Yes, Prime Minister), 1986
 "The Keys" (Seinfeld), a 1992 TV episode

Other uses in arts and media
 Key (character), a supervillain in the DC Comics universe
 Kirby's Epic Yarn (KEY), a 2010 game by Nintendo
 Key, the title character of Key the Metal Idol, a Japanese anime OVA series
 The Key, a painting by Jackson Pollock

People
 Key (entertainer) (born 1991), South Korean entertainer
 Key (surname)
 Keys (surname)

Sports
 Key (basketball), a restricted area around the basketball net
 Frederick Keys, a Double-A minor league baseball team

Technology

 Key (computing), a field in a computer file or database used to sort or retrieve records
 Key (engineering), a type of coupling used to transmit rotation between a shaft and an attached item
 KeY, a software verification tool
 The Key (smartcard), a contactless smartcard for public transport ticketing in Britain
 .key, file extension used by Keynote
 Identification key, used to identify biological entities
 Telegraph key, the button used by a telegraph operator

Other uses
 Key (company), a Japanese visual novel studio
 The Key School, an independent coeducational school in Annapolis, Maryland
 Keys, a truce term used in western Scotland
 Amazon Key a service by Amazon Prime allowing customers to get deliveries inside of their home or car
 House of Keys, the directly elected lower branch of Tynwald, the parliament of the Isle of Man
 Samara (fruit) or key, a type of fruit

See also
 
 
 Keay, a surname
 Keyes (disambiguation)
 Keying (disambiguation)
 Quay (disambiguation)
 Qi (disambiguation)
 The Keys (disambiguation)